James, Jim, or Jimmy Evans may refer to:

In sports
James Evans (running back) (1963–2015), American football running back
James Evans (cricketer) (1891–1973), English cricketer
Jim Evans (wide receiver) (born 1939), American football wide receiver and kick returner
Jimmy Evans (footballer, born 1894) (1894–1975), Welsh international footballer
Jim Evans (umpire) (born 1946), baseball umpire
James Evans (rugby league) (born 1978), Australian rugby league player, Wales international
Jim Evans (rugby union) (born 1980), English rugby union player
Jim Evans (rugby league) (1929–2013), Australian rugby player
Jimmy Evans (footballer, born 1999), Nigerian footballer

In politics and government
James La Fayette Evans (1825–1903), American politician from Indiana
James Evans (Ontario politician) (1848–1880), Canadian politician
James Evans (Minnesota politician) (1927–2012), American politician from Minnesota
James Evans (Mississippi politician) (born 1950), American politician from Mississippi
James Evans (Utah politician), American politician, Chairman of the Utah Republican Party
James Evans (Welsh politician), Welsh politician, member of the Senedd
Jim Evans (politician) (born 1948), American politician, Congressional candidate from Missouri
Jimmy Evans (politician) (1939–2021), American lawyer and politician

Other
James Evans, Sr. and J.J. Evans, fictional characters on the American television series Good Times
James Evans (linguist) (1801–1846), Canadian missionary
James A. Evans (1827–1887), English born civil engineer on the Union Pacific railroad (1863–1869)
James R. Evans (1845–1918), American Civil War soldier and Medal of Honor recipient
James Guy Evans (1809–1859), American painter
Jim Evans (artist) (born 1950), American painter
James H. Evans (born 1954), American photographer
James D. Evans, president of Lindenwood University
James Evans (historian) (born 1975), English historian, author and television producer
James Harington Evans (1785–1849), Church of England clergyman